Misses is a 1996 compilation album by Canadian singer-songwriter Joni Mitchell. The selections, chosen by Mitchell herself, concentrate on her lesser known, more experimental work, including jazz influenced recordings from the late 1970s and electronic music from the 1980s. Mitchell also designed the album cover. The album is a companion to Hits, issued on the same day. Mitchell agreed to a request from her record company to release a greatest hits album on the condition that she also be allowed to release Misses.

Cyndi Lauper nominated Misses as one of her all-time favourite albums, singling out "A Case of You". The best known song on Misses, "A Case of You" has been covered by Tori Amos, k.d. lang and Prince, among others.

Track listing 
All songs were written by Joni Mitchell, except where indicated.

 "Passion Play (When All the Slaves Are Free)" – 5:25
 From Night Ride Home, released in 1991
 "Nothing Can Be Done" – 4:53
 From Night Ride Home; music by Larry Klein
 "A Case of You" – 4:20
 From Blue, 1971
 "The Beat of Black Wings" – 5:19
 From Chalk Mark in a Rain Storm, 1988
 "Dog Eat Dog" – 4:41
 From Dog Eat Dog, 1985
 Features background vocals from James Taylor
 "The Wolf That Lives in Lindsey" – 6:35
 From Mingus, 1979
 "The Magdalene Laundries" – 4:02
 From Turbulent Indigo, 1994
 "The Impossible Dreamer" – 4:30
 From Dog Eat Dog
 "Sex Kills" – 3:56
 From Turbulent Indigo
 "The Reoccurring Dream" – 3:02
 From Chalk Mark in a Rain Storm; co-written by Larry Klein
 "Harry's House/Centerpiece" – 6:48
 From The Hissing of Summer Lawns, 1975
 "Centerpiece" was originally written by Harry Edison and Jon Hendricks in 1958. The liner notes credit Johnny Mandel and Hendricks.
 "The Arrangement" – 3:32
 From Ladies of the Canyon, 1970
 "For the Roses" – 3:48
 From For the Roses, 1972
 "Hejira" – 6:42
 From Hejira, 1976

References 

Joni Mitchell compilation albums
1996 compilation albums
Reprise Records compilation albums